Krathum Baen is a district (amphoe) in the northern part of Samut Sakhon province, central Thailand.

History
Krathum Baen was a part of Mueang Samut Sakhon district. It was created in 1900. In 1926 the government added Tambons Tha Mai, Bang Yang, Nong Kok Khai, and Om Noi of Sam Phran district, Nakhon Pathom province to the district.

Geography
Neighbouring districts are (from the north clockwise): Sam Phran of Nakhon Pathom province; Nong Khaem and  Bang Bon of Bangkok; Mueang Samut Sakhon and Ban Phaeo of Samut Sakhon Province.

The important water resources are the Tha Chin river and Phasi Charoen canal.

The name Krathum Baen meaning 'flat burflower-tree'.

Administration
The district is divided into 10 subdistricts (tambons), which are further subdivided into 76 villages (mubans). There is a city (thesaban nakhon), Om Noi, and a town (thesaban mueang), Krathum Baen. The non-municipal area is administered by eight tambon administrative organizations (TAO).

Krathum Baen